St Mary the Virgin may refer to:

People
 Mary (mother of Jesus)

Churches
Reading Minster (known as the Minster Church of St Mary the Virgin), England
St Mary the Virgin, Alderbury, Wiltshire, England
St Mary the Virgin, Aldermanbury, England
St Mary the Virgin, Aldworth, Berkshire, England
St Mary the Virgin, Alton Barnes, Wiltshire, England
St Mary the Virgin, Blackburn Hamlet, Canada
St Mary the Virgin, Brampton Ash, England
St Mary the Virgin, Brighton, England
St Mary the Virgin, Barnes, England
St Mary the Virgin, Bathwick, England
St Mary the Virgin, Bottesford, Leicestershire, England
St Mary the Virgin Church, Caerau, Cardiff, Wales
St Mary the Virgin, Car Colston, Nottinghamshire, England
St Mary the Virgin, Corringham, Essex, Englind
St Mary the Virgin, Cottingham, East Yorkshire, England 
St Mary the Virgin, East Barnet, England
Church of St Mary the Virgin, Eccles, England
St Mary the Virgin, Ellenbrook, Greater Manchester, England
St Mary the Virgin, Gillingham, Dorset, England
St Mary the Virgin, Great Snoring, Norfolk, England
St Mary the Virgin, Heacham, Norfolk, England 
St Mary the Virgin, Henbury, England
St Mary the Virgin, Henlow, Bedfordshire, England
St Mary the Virgin, Iffley, Oxford, England
St Mary the Virgin Church, Ilford, London, England
St Mary the Virgin, Ilmington, Warwickshire, England
St Mary the Virgin, Ivinghoe, Buckinghamshire, England
St Mary the Virgin, Langley, England
St Mary the Virgin, Lytchett Matravers, Dorset, England
St Mary the Virgin, Middleton, Leeds, England
St Mary the Virgin, Monken Hadley, England
St Mary the Virgin, Newington, Swale, England
St Mary the Virgin, Northolt, England
St Mary the Virgin, North Shoebury, Essex, England
St Mary the Virgin, Prittlewell, Essex, England
St Mary the Virgin, Salford, Bedfordshire, England
St Mary the Virgin, Seaham, County Durham, England
St Mary the Virgin, Staverton, Northamptonshire, England
University Church of St Mary the Virgin, Oxford, England
St Mary the Virgin, Westerham, Kent, England
The Episcopal Church of St Mary the Virgin, San Francisco, California, US